Vidal Fernandez is a Mexican-American former soccer player who played professionally in the North American Soccer League, Major Indoor Soccer League and Western Soccer Alliance.

Youth
Fernandez was born in Mexico, but moved to Otay Mesa, San Diego, California where he entered Chula Vista High School.  He was the 1977 California Interscholastic Federation Soccer Player of the Year as Chula Vista won back to back CIF championships.  He is a member of the Sweetwater Union High School District Alumni Hall of Fame.  He attended San Diego State University, playing on the men's soccer team from 1977 to 1979.  He is a member of the SDSU Aztecs Hall of Fame.  He became a U.S. citizen in 1979.

Professional
In December 1979, the New York Cosmos selected Fernandez in the first round of the North American Soccer League draft.  He injured his right knee during the 1980 pre-season and had surgery to remove his meniscus.  He remained out for the entire 1980 season and was released in August 1980.  He then signed as a free agent with the California Surf in 1981.  The Surf folded at the end of the season and in the fall of 1981, Fernandez signed with the San Diego Sockers in time to play the NASL indoor season.  He went on to play the 1982 NASL outdoor and the 1982-1983 Major Indoor Soccer League seasons with the Sockers.  In February 1983, Alkis Panagoulias selected Fernandez for Team America, an attempt to place the United States men's national soccer team into a competitive league.  He turned down Team America to remain with the Sockers only to injure his right knee in May 1983.   He continued to play, including five games during the 1983-1984 NASL indoor season before retiring in November 1984.  In 1986, he attempted to return to soccer when he played as a defender with the San Diego Nomads of the Western Soccer Alliance.  In April 1987, Fernandez played one game while on a ten-day contract with the Sockers.

Coach
Fernandez is the head coach of the Chula Vista High School soccer teams, a position he has held since the mid-1980s.

References

External links
 NASL/MISL stats

1958 births
Living people
American soccer coaches
American soccer players
California Surf players
Footballers from Mexico City
Mexican footballers
Mexican emigrants to the United States
Major Indoor Soccer League (1978–1992) players
New York Cosmos players
North American Soccer League (1968–1984) indoor players
North American Soccer League (1968–1984) players
San Diego Sockers (NASL) players
San Diego Sockers (original MISL) players
San Diego State Aztecs men's soccer players
Nomads Soccer Club players
Western Soccer Alliance players
American sportspeople of Mexican descent
Association football forwards
Association football midfielders
Sportspeople from Chula Vista, California
Soccer players from California